The 2021 season is PDRM's 31st season in existence and the first season in the Malaysia Premier League since relegation from Malaysia Super League last year.

Players

First-team squad

Statistics

Appearances and goals

|}

References

2021
Malaysian football clubs 2021 season